Dixon Recreation Center is located on the Oregon State University campus in Corvallis, Oregon, United States.

The recreation center features two gyms, beach volleyball courts, a climbing area, multi-purpose rooms, a pool and dive well, racquetball courts, squash courts, indoor track and weight rooms.

References

External links
 

Oregon State University buildings
University and college student recreation centers in the United States